Besant C. Raj (5 February 1933 – 12 March 2018) was a well-known management and financial consultant in India and abroad, and the founder member of ICFAI University. He was an advisor to many government and non-government organizations in the state of Chennai, Mumbai, Kerala and Andhra Pradesh, India. He was closely associated with several educational institutions like the Jawaharlal Nehru Institute of Development Banking of IDBI and was the Chancellor of the ICFAI University, Dehradun, Uttaranchal.

Education 
He holds a doctoral degree in Business Administration, specializing in Financial Management from the Harvard Business School. He was an MBA from the Indian Institute of Management Ahmedabad (first batch) and has a master's degree in Philosophy from Madras University and a master's degree in Psychology from Banaras Hindu University.

Publications 

 Public Enterprise Investment Decisions in India: A Managerial Analysis, Macmillan 1977.
 Corporate Financial Management: An Introduction, Tata McGraw Hill publishing company Ltd., 1978.
 Unravelling the China Miracle-A comparative study with India (1950–2005), Book Surge Publishing-an Amazon.com Company, USA, 2006.

Professional 
 Dr. Besant was a Member, Board of Governors of the ICFAI University.
 Chairman of the board of The Madras Christian College, Tambaram, Chennai.
 Director of Studies at the Administrative Staff College of India, Hyderabad

References

External links 
ICFAI University
Biography at Besant Raj International Ltd

1933 births
2018 deaths
Banaras Hindu University alumni
Harvard Business School alumni
Indian financial writers
Indian Institute of Management Ahmedabad alumni
University of Madras alumni